Chamchamal Rural District is a rural district (dehestan) in Bisotun District, Harsin County, Kermanshah Province, Iran. At the 2006 census, its population was 17,222, in 3,930 families. The rural district has 50 villages.

References 

Rural Districts of Kermanshah Province
Harsin County